Francisco Agustín González (born 6 April 2001) is an Argentine professional footballer who plays as a left winger for Newell's Old Boys.

Club career
González was produced by the Newell's Old Boys youth system, having also played for Malvinas Argentinas and Sportivo Unión Ordóñez at youth level. It was manager Héctor Bidoglio who promoted the forward into the club's senior set-up, as he was selected to start a Copa de la Superliga first round fixture with Gimnasia y Esgrima on 21 April 2019; he played sixty-nine minutes of a second leg home defeat as they were eliminated on aggregate.

International career
From 2018, González received call-ups from the Argentina U20s; including for friendlies in Murcia, Spain in 2019. He was selected to return to Spain with the Argentina U18s in July 2019, as he made the twenty-two man list for the L'Alcúdia International Tournament. He scored on his fourth competition appearance, netting in a five-goal victory over Bahrain on 6 August.

Career statistics
.

References

External links

2001 births
Living people
Sportspeople from Córdoba Province, Argentina
Argentine footballers
Argentina youth international footballers
Association football wingers
Newell's Old Boys footballers